New Hymn to Freedom is the second studio album by British band Szun Waves. It was released on 31 August 2018 through The Leaf Label.

Accolades

Track listing

References

2018 albums
The Leaf Label albums